Ligel Lambert (born May 20, 1982) is a Haitian-born American interdisciplinary artist, entrepreneur, educator and graphic designer who primarily works in painting, collage, printmaking, assemblage (art) and sculpture. He is best known for his colorful, Fauvist, rhythmic and abstracted interpretations of musicians, interpretations of sounds and musical themed paintings.

Education and military service
Ligel (pronounced Lee - Jeal) received a Master of Fine Arts from RMIT University (RMIT School of Art), Melbourne in 2013. He received a Master of Education degree in Curriculum & Instruction from the University of West Florida, Pensacola in 2021. Ligel also holds a Bachelor of Fine Arts in Graphic Design. Ligel graduated from the United States Armed Forces School of Music in 2001. He is an honorably discharged Veteran of the United States Marine Corps (USMC).

Life

Ligel grew up in Savannah, Georgia, United States. He attended the Savannah Arts Academy, High School of the Visual & Performing Arts and graduated in 2000. He then attended the Savannah College of Art & Design (SCAD) briefly before enlisting in the United States Military (The United States Marine Corps). After his honorable military service, Ligel attended Armstrong Atlantic State University, now the Georgia Southern University-Armstrong Campus. In an article written by Amy Morris, which was published by the Savannah Morning News as well as the Florida Times Union, documented in the Spring of 2006, Ligel was chosen as the Artist for the 2006 Jacksonville Jazz Festival poster design contest. At the time, Ligel was the first out of state resident to win the jazz festival's poster design contest. In 2007, Ligel's Art was selected for the 2007 Capital Jazz Festival. From 2007–2011, Ligel was the Artistic Director, board member and graphic designer for the Savannah Jazz Festival, presented by the Coastal Jazz Association of Savannah, Georgia.

In 2010, Ligel was selected as the Artist for the Black Heritage Festival. In 2011, Ligel was briefly an adjunct faculty at the Savannah Technical College, located in Savannah, Georgia. In 2012, Ligel became one of the finalists for the Runway-to-Win design challenge. His works have been exhibited in many venues in the United States and abroad. Ligel founded a business, The Art of Ligel, in October 2018. Ligel is currently based in New York City.

Academic publications 
 Technology in the Art Classroom (Grades 9–12)

Teaching 

In an article written by Nathan Driskell and published in June 2016, Ligel is listed to have taught high school students in the United States, South Korea, Japan and in China. In China, Ligel taught the IBDP Visual Art at Shanghai Shixi High School.

Collaborations

For more than a decade, Ligel has collaborated with musician and professor, Wycliffe Gordon on numerous projects. In 2011, Ligel collaborated with musician, President and CEO of Benedetto Guitars Inc., Howard R. Paul and Grammy Award-winning performing artist and songwriter, Bob James (musician).

Selected collections
 RMIT University 
 Savannah State University
 The Beach Institute/the King-Tisdell Cottage Foundation Inc. 
 Coastal Jazz Association/Savannah Jazz Festival
 The City of Jacksonville, FL (Jacksonville Jazz Festival)
 Ligel is also a featured artist on Artsy.

See also 
 List of RMIT University people
 List of University of West Florida people

References

External links
 

Living people
RMIT University alumni
Interdisciplinary artists
1982 births
Haitian artists
Haitian emigrants to the United States
American male painters
Abstract painters
21st-century American educators
People from Savannah, Georgia
Modern painters
People from Cap-Haïtien
University of West Florida alumni
American graphic designers
Album-cover and concert-poster artists
American poster artists
American contemporary painters
American collage artists
Fauvism
American conceptual artists
American printmakers
21st-century American painters
21st-century American businesspeople
American company founders
American people of Haitian descent
 Educational research